is a Japanese actress.

Career
Amami joined the Takarazuka Revue in 1987 and retired from the stage company in 1995. Amami was the youngest actress in the company's history to be cast in a top male role.

She was involved in various famous musicals when she was in the company, including Gone With the Wind, where she starred as Rhett Butler, and Me and My Girl. After resigning from the company, she continued to work as a TV and movie actress.

In May 2013, Amami suffered a mild heart attack after performing in the stage production L’honneur de Napoleon at the Tokyo Metropolitan Theatre. Although she wanted to return, she decided to bow out of the role on her doctor's advice and wrote a letter of apology to her fans.

Filmography

Film

TV drama

Japanese dub

Awards

References

External links

  

1967 births
Living people
Actresses from Tokyo
Takarazuka Revue
Ken-On artists